= Naukot railway station =

Railway station in Pakistan

General information
- Coordinates: 24°51′30″N 69°24′8″E
- Owner: Ministry of Railways

History
- Former names: Great Indian Peninsula Railway
Location

Naukot railway station (Urdu: نوکوٹ روڈ ریلوے اسٹیشن) is located in Sindh, Pakistan.

== See also ==
- List of railway stations in Pakistan
- Pakistan Railways
